Jack Lee (born 19 December 1998) is an English professional footballer who last played as a defender for Championship club Sheffield Wednesday.

Club career

Sheffield Wednesday
Lee joined the Owls' academy in January 2015 after impressing on a trial basis, before signing his first professional contract in December that year.

Lee started the 2018–19 season on the first team bench, and made his professional debut against Sunderland in the EFL Cup First Round on 16 August 2018 alongside Alex Hunt and Matt Penney.

Career statistics

References

Sheffield Wednesday F.C. players
1998 births
Living people
English footballers
Association football defenders